Gleb Olegovich Pavlovsky (5 March 1951 – 26 February 2023) was a  Russian political scientist who also described himself as a "political technologist". During the Soviet era, he was prosecuted as a dissident. From 1996 to 2011 he was a political adviser to Vladimir Putin. From then, he was a critic of the Russian government.

Pavlovsky was president of the Foundation for Effective Politics (FEP). In 1997, he helped create "Russian Journal", one of Russia's oldest websites.  Pavlovsky and FEP organized and financed many early websites on the Runet, including Lenta.ru. From 2005 to 2008, Pavlovsky hosted the weekly television news commentary "Real Politics", which was shown on NTV Russia at 10:00 p.m. on Saturdays. In 2012, he became editor-in-chief of Gefter.ru, a Russian-language blog.

Biography
Pavlovsky was born in Odessa in Ukraine on 5 March 1951 in a family of engineers. From 1968 to 1973, he studied history at Odessa University. His first publication (in a university newspaper) was censored by the Politburo because of its alleged "anarchistic and left- extremist mood".

At the age of 21, Pavlovsky and friends organized a political commune "Субъект Исторической Деятельности" (Subject of Historical Action), inspired by the spirit of the protests of 1968 and ideals of intellectual Marxism (at the time, he described himself as a "Zen Marxist"). At this stage, Pavlovsky began to increase his links to the dissident movement in Odessa. He first came into contact with the KGB in 1974.

As the 70s went on, Pavlovsky cemented his place in Moscow's dissident movement and began publishing an underground newspaper entitled "Poiski", all while avoiding KGB interference. In 1982, he was arrested for anti-Soviet activity and sentenced to three years in exile in the Komi Republic. Before the trial, he initially collaborated with the authorities, although during the trial he disowned his testimony. In Komi, he made a living as a house painter and stoker. By 1985, he had returned to civilian life in Moscow, where he was able to pursue further engagements.

Between 1996 and 2011, Pavlovsky worked closely with Vladimir Putin as a Kremlin adviser and political strategist during Putin's initial tenure as president and prime minister. He was instrumental in the development of managed democracy in Russia at this time.

Pavlovsky was fired from this position in the spring of 2011. 

Pavolvsky became a critic of the Russian government. In a 2012 interview, he did not expect Putin to stay in power beyond 2018.

Media 

 1991—1992 — vice chair of "Kommersant" publishing house.
 1994—1995 — editor-in-chief quarterly published magazine "Переделы Власти"
 1995—1996 — founder and co-editor of "Sreda" magazine.
 1997—co-founder and editor-in-chief of internet magazine "Russian journal".
 2005 — co-founder and editor of "Europe" publishing house.
 April 2012 — founder and editor-in-chief of the Gefter.ru blog named after the Russian and Soviet historian  (1918–1995).

Notes

External links

 gefter.ru
 Europe publishing house
 Biography of Pavlovsky
 Article about Pavlovsky on OpenDemocracy.net
 Interview with Pavlovsky 2013

1951 births
2023 deaths
Writers from Odesa
Odesa University alumni
Communist Party of the Soviet Union members
Soviet journalists
Male journalists
Russian political scientists
Soviet prisoners and detainees
Internet in Russia
Academic staff of the Higher School of Economics
Recipients of the Medal of the Order "For Merit to the Fatherland" II class
Soviet dissidents
Russian exiles